Jillian's was a restaurant and entertainment chain with locations in the United States, headquartered in Reno, Nevada. As of December 2018, all former locations have been closed.

History
Jillian's was founded in 1985 as a billiards club located near Fenway Park in Boston by Stephen Foster. The club was named after Foster's wife, Jillian. The couple later founded the chain Lucky Strike Lanes. Within several years, the owners opened another branch in Seattle. By the early 1990s, it had become a competitor of Dave & Buster's, expanding its locations to include restaurants, video game arcades, bowling alleys, nightclubs, and conference rooms. By 2000, there were roughly 30 locations in the U.S. and one in Montréal, Canada.

In August 2001, the LA area Jillian's was seen on GSN as Jeffrey Ross hosted in between episode spots for one week during GSN's Let's Make a Deal-a-thon, the week GSN started airing LMAD reruns. On May 25, 2004, Jillian's Entertainment Holdings, Inc. filed for Chapter 11 bankruptcy and arranged to sell its assets. Nine of the Jillian's locations and the Jillian's tradename were sold to Dave & Buster's.  At least some of these locations were eventually converted to operation under the Dave & Buster's name, and some were rebranded as "Dave & Buster's Grand Sports Cafe". In 2009, D&B, which itself was going through the process of being sold from one venture capital firm to another, sold the rights to the name to Gemini Investors. That company later established JBC Entertainment Holdings, Inc. to operate these locations.

Many of the locations no longer exist: the location at Neonopolis in downtown Las Vegas (which closed in 2008 after also being used as a concert venue) and the location at Peabody Place in Memphis, Tennessee, which shut down in 2009, and the Jillian's of Boardman Township, Ohio at the Southern Park Mall was closed down on January 30, 2011, but for reasons unknown, in the old Woolworth building. The location in Charlotte, North Carolina closed down in February 2010. The Cleveland Heights, Ohio location also closed on February 20, 2011, and was converted into Myxx, a tapas bar, by its owner. The location in Seattle was closed in 2012. The location in Peoria, Illinois closed May 2013. The location in Chesapeake, Virginia was closed July 28, 2014, then reopened as GameWorks on August 1, 2014. On January 6, 2016, Inside Universal reported that the Jillian's Hi-Life Lanes location in Universal City had closed and will be replaced by Jimmy Buffett's Margaritaville. In 2017, the Worcester, Massachusetts location closed, and the original Jillian's in Boston was converted into Lucky Strike Social, even though it kept the Jillian's branding. In 2018, the San Francisco Jillian's was converted into Tabletop Tap House, a hipster-styled similar joint.

References

External links
  (from the Internet Archive Wayback Machine)

Restaurants established in 1985
Entertainment companies established in 1985
Entertainment companies of the United States
Video arcades
Regional restaurant chains in the United States
Defunct restaurant chains in the United States
Companies that filed for Chapter 11 bankruptcy in 2004
1985 establishments in Massachusetts
Restaurants disestablished in 2018
Entertainment companies disestablished in 2018
2018 disestablishments in Massachusetts
Companies based in Reno, Nevada